"Writing about music is like dancing about architecture" is a maxim used to express the futility of translating music through words. It may be employed as an argument for dismissing music criticism altogether.

The quote's origin is unknown. It is most commonly misattributed to musicians Laurie Anderson and Elvis Costello. Others, including Costello himself, credit the remark to comedian Martin Mull, although a variation ("talking about music is like singing about economics") has appeared in print since as early as 1918.

Origins

The origins of the quote have never been verified. It has been attributed to musicians, entertainers, and writers such as William S. Burroughs, Miles Davis, Thelonious Monk, Charles Mingus, Frank Zappa, George Carlin, Martin Mull, Lester Bangs, David Byrne, Steve Martin, Elvis Costello, and Laurie Anderson.

One of the earliest known usages of the phrase "dancing about architecture" appears in a 1979 Detroit Free Press magazine article, where it is attributed to Martin Mull, although this instance is predated by other print sources that contain similar expressions such as "singing about economics". A 1918 New Republic article remarks,

The maxim reappeared in a 1921 article penned by academic Winthrop Parkhurst, who wrote,

In a 1983 interview, Elvis Costello responded to a question about his treatment in the music press by stating, in part,

Costello subsequently became widely identified with the quote. In a later interview, he denied having originated the phrase, adding with uncertainty that he may have gotten the line from Mull. Laurie Anderson believed that the "dancing about architecture" saying had derived from Steve Martin.

Criticism
Music critic Robert Christgau responded to the maxim:

See also
 Microgenres
 Rockism and poptimism

Notes

References

English phrases
English-language idioms
1970s neologisms
Quotations
Philosophical arguments
Music criticism